Helmut Nonn (born 18 October 1933 in Mülheim an der Ruhr) is a German former field hockey player who competed in the 1956 Summer Olympics and in the 1960 Summer Olympics.

References

External links
 

1933 births
Living people
German male field hockey players
Olympic field hockey players of the United Team of Germany
Field hockey players at the 1956 Summer Olympics
Field hockey players at the 1960 Summer Olympics
Olympic bronze medalists for the United Team of Germany
Olympic medalists in field hockey
Medalists at the 1956 Summer Olympics
20th-century German people